Protein cornichon homolog 4 is a protein that in humans is encoded by the CNIH4 gene.

References

Further reading

External links